General elections were held in South Africa on 17 May 1933 to elect the 150 members of the House of Assembly. The National Party won half the seats in the House, but the coalition with the South African Party continued.

Changes to the franchise
Since the 1929 election several changes had been made to the franchise laws. Adult white women were enfranchised in 1930. In 1931 all European males over the age of 21 were enfranchised (eliminating property and wage qualifications for that section of the population).

One effect of these changes, which were not extended to the non-white population of the Union, was to dilute the influence of the non-white electors in Cape Province and Natal.

Delimitation of electoral divisions
The South Africa Act 1909 had provided for a delimitation commission to define the boundaries for each electoral division. The representation by province, under the sixth delimitation report of 1932, is set out in the table below. The figures in brackets are the number of electoral divisions in the previous (1928) delimitation. If there is no figure in brackets then the number was unchanged.

Results
The vote totals in the table below may not give a complete picture of the balance of political opinion, because of unopposed elections (where no votes were cast) and because contested seats may not have been fought by a candidate from all major parties.

As the two largest parties were in coalition together, the opposition to the government was weaker and more fragmented than in any other election in South African history.

An alternative breakdown of members, distinguishing between supporters and opponents of the coalition, was (pro Coalition) NP 75, SAP 61, Creswell Labour 2, Roos 2; (opposition) National Council Labour 2, Natal Home Ruler 2, Independents 6. Another interpretation, is NP 75, SAP 61, Labour 4, Roos Party 2, Home Rule group 2 and Independents 6.

References
 Keesing's Contemporary Archives
 The Rise of the South African Reich, by Brian Bunting, (first published by Penguin Africa Library in 1964 and revised in 1969) accessed on an ANC website 3 August 2010
 Smuts: A Reappraisal, by Bernard Friedman (George, Allen & Unwin 1975) 
 South Africa 1982 Official Yearbook of the Republic of South Africa, published by Chris van Rensburg Publications
 The South African Constitution, by H.J. May (3rd edition 1955, Juta & Co)

General elections in South Africa
South Africa
General
May 1933 events